Charles Louis Lanza (born September 20, 1964) is a former American football center who played two seasons with the Pittsburgh Steelers of the National Football League (NFL). He was drafted by the Pittsburgh Steelers in the third round of the 1988 NFL Draft. He played college football at University of Notre Dame and attended Christian Brothers High School in Memphis, Tennessee.

References

External links
Just Sports Stats
Fanbase profile

Living people
1964 births
Players of American football from Memphis, Tennessee
Players of American football from Pennsylvania
American football centers
Notre Dame Fighting Irish football players
Pittsburgh Steelers players
People from Coraopolis, Pennsylvania